Darshan Kadian  is an Indian Kabaddi player. He was part of the Indian team which won gold medal at the 2019 South Asian Games. He has also featured in all the seasons of the Pro Kabaddi League. He is a member of the Puneri Paltan team.

References 

Living people
Indian kabaddi players
South Asian Games gold medalists for India
South Asian Games medalists in kabaddi
1994 births
Pro Kabaddi League players